HII may refer to:

People 
 Xǔ (surname), spelled Hii based on its Hakka or Min Dong pronunciations
 Hii King Chiong (born 1957), Malaysian businessman
 Joseph Hii Teck Kwong (born 1965), Malaysian Catholic bishop
 Mimi Hii (born 1969), British chemist
 Remy Hii (born ), Malaysian actor

Other uses 
 HII, formerly known as Huntington Ingalls Industries, Inc., an American shipbuilder and sole provider of the US Navy's aircraft carrier fleet
 H-II, a family of Japanese liquid-fueled rockets
 H-IIA
 H-IIB
 H-II Transfer Vehicle, a Japan Aerospace Exploration Agency unmanned spacecraft
 H II region, a region of interstellar atomic hydrogen that is ionized
 Hinduri language, spoken in India
 Human Influence Index
 Human Interface Infrastructure, or HII, part of the Unified Extensible Firmware Interface
 Hydraulics International
 Islamic and National Revolution Movement of Afghanistan
 Lake Havasu City Airport, Arizona, United States (IATA code)
 HII (album), a 1997 album by Japanese producer DJ Honda
 Hii River

See also 
 H2 (disambiguation)